Carey Maxon (born 1978) is an American artist. Her work is included in the collections of the Whitney Museum of American Art and the Museum of Modern Art, New York.

References

1978 births
Living people
21st-century American artists
21st-century American women artists